Åke Sigurd Tobias Baudin (born 25 December 1974) is a Swedish Social Democratic politician and trade union leader who has served as Secretary-General of the Social Democratic Party since November 2021. He served as President of the Swedish Municipal Workers' Union from 2016 to 2021 and previously served as vice president of the same organization from 2010 to 2012 before serving as vice president of the Swedish Trade Union Confederation (LO) from 2012 to 2016.

Biography

Early life and education 
Baudin has a professional background as a machinist and has been educated in automation and control engineering.

Trade union career 
He became involved with the trade union Swedish Municipal Workers' Union through his workplace and was elected a workplace representative in 2000. From 2004 to 2010, Baudin was elected to the trade unions federal board. He has served as president of the Swedish Municipal Workers' Union in Norrbotten (2009–2010), first vice president of the same organization from 2010 to 2012 and as first vice president of Swedish Trade Union Confederation (LO) (2012–2016).

President of the Swedish Municipal Workers' Union 
Baudin was elected trade union president for the Swedish Municipal Workers' Union at the union's congress in 2016, as Annelie Nordström's successor.

Political career

Secretary-General of the Social Democratic Party 
Baudin was designated Secretary-General of the Social Democratic Party on 12 October 2021 ahead of the party's congress in November 2021 alongside Magdalena Andersson as party leader. He was subsequently elected to the position on 6 November 2021.

References 

1974 births
Living people
Swedish trade union leaders
Swedish Social Democratic Party politicians
People from Norrbotten County